van den Steen is a surname. Notable people with this name include:

 Cornelius a Lapide (1567 – 1637), born Cornelis Cornelissen van den Steen, Flemish Jesuit and exegete
 Eric J. van den Steen, Belgian-American economist
 Kelly Van den Steen, a Belgian racing cyclist
 Maria de Villegas de Saint-Pierre, also as Countess Maria Van den Steen de Jehay (1870-1941), Belgian writer

See also
 Van der Steen

Surnames of Dutch origin